Be Myself is the tenth studio album by American singer-songwriter Sheryl Crow. The album was released on April 21, 2017, by Wylie Songs and Warner Bros. Records. Produced by Crow and Jeff Trott, who also worked with Crow on her self-titled 1996 album and 1998's The Globe Sessions, it features a return to a more rock-driven sound following Crow's 2013 country album, Feels Like Home.

Release

Singles
The album's lead single, "Halfway There", was released on March 3, 2017.

Critical reception

Be Myself received mostly positive reviews from music critics. At Metacritic, which assigns a normalized rating out of 100 to reviews from mainstream critics, the album has an average score of 69 out of 100, which indicates "generally favorable reviews" based on 10 reviews.

Stephen Thomas Erlewine of AllMusic rated the album four out of five stars and calls it "set of strong, sophisticated pop." Writing for Rolling Stone and rating the album three out of five stars, Rob Sheffield calls it "excellent" and "a full-blown return to her fierce rock-queen glory."

Dave Simpson from The Guardian gave 3 out of 5 stars and stated "After a short-lived dabble in country music, Be Myself reunites Sheryl Crow with 1990s collaborators Jeff Trott and Tchad Blake and returns to the sassy, carefree, stripped down folk-pop-rock that brought her massive success in that era"

Sal Cinquemani from Slant Magazine rated 3.5 out of 5 stars and wrote "Be Myself might lack the quirks that made Sheryl Crow so distinctive (it opened with a song about aliens, after all), but the album proves that some alliances can outlast even the latest planet-shrinking technology".

Track listing
All songs written by Sheryl Crow and Jeff Trott, except where noted.

Personnel
Credits adapted from AllMusic.

Musicians
 Doyle Bramhall II – soloist, vocal harmony
 Gary Clark Jr. – electric guitar, soloist
 Sheryl Crow – bass, celeste, Fender Rhodes, acoustic guitar, piano, tambourine, toy piano, vocals, Wurlitzer
 Mark Douthit – saxophone
 Fred Eltringham – drums, handclapping, percussion, tambourine
 Audley Freed – acoustic guitar, soloist
 Toby Gad – bass guitar, Moog synthesizer
 Josh Grange – flute, baritone guitar, electric guitar, lap steel guitar, Mellotron, pedal steel guitar, piano
 Barry Green – trombone
 Robert Kearns – bass guitar

 The McCrary Sisters – background vocals
 Adam Minkoff – keyboards
 Doug Moffet – baritone saxophone
 Steve Patrick – trumpet
 Andrew Petroff – bells, drum brushes, drum loop, acoustic guitar, handclapping, keyboards, percussion, shaker, strings, synthesizer, tambourine, Wurlitzer
 Rick Purcell – handclapping
 David Rossi – strings
 Tim Smith – background vocals
 Jeff Trott – bass guitar, acoustic guitar, baritone guitar, electric guitar, acoustic-electric guitar, Moog synthesizer, pump organ, sitar, slide guitar, soloist, SynthAxe, tom-tom, vocal harmony, background vocals, wah wah guitar, Wurlitzer

Technical personnel
 Tchad Blake – engineer, mixing, photography
 Drew Bollman – engineer
 Sheryl Crow – producer
 Bob Ludwig – mastering
 Frank Maddocks – art direction, design
 Andrew Petroff – engineer
 Rick Purcell – studio technician
 Matt Rausch – engineer
 David Rossi – string arrangements
 Mark Seliger – photography
 Jeff Trott – producer
 Alberto Vaz – engineer

Charts

Release history

References

2017 albums
Sheryl Crow albums
Warner Records albums